Season 2009–10 was Airdrie United's eighth competitive season. They competed in the First Division, Challenge Cup, League Cup and the Scottish Cup.

Summary
Airdrie United finished ninth in the First Division, entering the play-offs losing 3–1 to Brechin on aggregate and were relegated to the Second Division. They reached the fourth round of the Scottish Cup, the first round of the League Cup and the first round of the Challenge Cup.

League table

Results and fixtures

First Division

First Division play-offs

Challenge Cup

League Cup

Scottish Cup

Player statistics

Squad

|}

a.  Includes other competitive competitions, including playoffs and the Scottish Challenge Cup.

References

Airdrieonians F.C. seasons
Airdrie United